is a 2002 action game developed by Smilebit and published by Sega for the Xbox; it is a sequel to the Dreamcast game Jet Set Radio (2000). As a re-imagining of the original game, it features improved gameplay mechanics, updated graphics, larger open world environments, new characters, a new soundtrack and multiplayer gameplay. The player controls members of a street gang that use inline skates to traverse a futuristic Tokyo, spraying graffiti, challenging rival gangs and evading authorities. Like Jet Set Radio, Future uses a cel-shaded style of animation.

Much like its predecessor, Jet Set Radio Future received critical acclaim for its gameplay, music and art style. It won several awards and was nominated for many others. After its initial release, it was bundled with new Xbox consoles with Sega GT 2002 on a dual-game DVD.

Gameplay

Jet Set Radio Future plays similarly to Jet Set Radio in which the player controls a member of a gang of inline skaters called the GGs to gain control of a futuristic Tokyo.  Players can grind through rails and poles, perform various tricks while grinding, perform various mid-air tricks, skate backwards, and use boosts on the ground and on rails in order to move faster. When a player is skating fast, they can come to a quick stop by performing an advanced inline-skating move called the powerslide.

Much of the game requires the player to search for graffiti tags left by other gangs and spray over them with their own. To do this, players will need to collect spray cans littered across each stage. Spraying is more streamlined from the last game, with manual spraying over large tags replaced by multiple spray targets depending on the tag's size. Unlike Jet Set Radio, there is no time limit and spray targets can be completed at any time.

Stages in the level are larger, more open world and are now interconnected, with time limits removed, and often feature multiple objectives. These range from mimicking a rival's trick line or beating other skaters in a race. The police, who previously chased after the player in the last game, now appear in specific areas, with the player tasked with stopping them by charging into them and spraying them to defeat them. Each area has hidden items to collect, including Graffiti Souls, which unlock new graffiti designs, and Hidden Tapes which unlock additional missions where more Graffiti Souls can be earned. The game features multiplayer gameplay up to 4 players and several multiplayer modes. The game also features the option to design one's tags.

Plot

In futuristic Tokyo, referred to in the game as "Tokyo-to", a group of teenage skaters called the GG's vie for control of Tokyo-to against rival groups. The Rokkaku Group, a megacorporation, has taken over much of the city and their leader is the new mayor of Tokyo-to. The group is oppressing the people, taking away freedom of speech and expression, and is forcing other gang members to give up their territory using the corrupt police force of Tokyo-to.

The game begins with the player in control of a character called Yoyo, who must complete a set of basic training exercises from Gum to prove himself worthy of joining the GGs. After completing these challenges, the game is interrupted by a pirate radio broadcast by 'DJ Professor K' who informs the player on the turmoil within Tokyo-to. After this cutscene, the player is released into Tokyo-to itself, where they cover Dogenzaka Hill in graffiti, race a new skater named Beat and fight the authoritarian Rokkaku Group and their police force, the Rokkaku Police.

The plot begins with the GG's discovering a gang stole a statue referred to as "the Goddess of the Street". The GG's cover up graffiti in Shibuya Terminal, in doing this they discover it was Poison Jam who stole the statue and tagged the terminal. A character named Combo joins the GGs. The GGs later cover up Poison Jam's turf: Chuo Street and Rokkaku Dai Heights, while dealing with the Rokkaku Police before questioning Poison Jam's rivals, Rapid 99 in 99th Street, for the location of their hideout. There, in the Tokyo Underground Sewage Facility, they realize the entrance to their hideout, The Bottom Point of The Sewage Facility is locked using graffiti activated switches, they spray them all, open the door and fight Poison Jam and their boss, Cube, for control of the statue.

After the GG's win the battle against Poison Jam, a new gang springs up, the robotic Noise Tanks, who have taken Tokyo by storm and is already in control of three gangs. At the same time, one of the GGs, Yoyo, disappears without a trace. The GGs decide to question one of the Noise Tanks' gangs, the mummified Immortals, wondering if the Noise Tanks sudden appearance had anything to do with Yoyo, they go and graffiti their turf: the Skyscraper District & Pharaoh Park, Hikage Street, Kibogaoka Hill and defeat the Immortals in Highway Zero. In doing so they reveal they had supposedly kidnapped Yoyo; however, when he is freed, he turns on the GGs and enslaves them under the Noise Tanks' control.

The Noise Tanks then have the gangs under their control battle in the game "Death Ball". Those who lose are brainwashed and controlled by the Noise Tanks for life. The GGs succeed in all three games, one against the Doom Riders, one against the Immortals and one against the Love Shockers, but then the Rokkaku Police suddenly appear and crackdown on the whole final game. When the GGs win this battle again, the Noise Tanks become furious, releasing hundreds of Noise Tank androids to terrorize the street. When the GGs clear out all of the androids, they discover a wounded Poison Jam, who reveals that Yoyo had beaten him and ran off to the nearby amusement park called Sky Dinosaurian Square. There, it is revealed that 'Yoyo' was a Noise Tank in disguise, and the real Yoyo had been missing the whole time. After the GGs defeat them, a mysterious man destroys the Noise Tanks and runs off. They soon discover the Noise Tanks were built by the Rokkaku Group to take over the gangs of Tokyo.

After the Noise Tanks are destroyed, two new threats appear: a Yakuza-style gang called the Golden Rhinos who are bent on eliminating all graffiti in the city, along with executing all Rudies; and an insane demon-like creature who sprays odd graffiti and looks strangely like one of the GGs, Beat. Amid all this heat, the GGs are approached by Clutch, a Rudie who knows where Yoyo is; the player needs to find a certain number of Graffiti Souls for the info. When the GGs give him his payment, he runs off without telling any information. They chase after him in either Chuo Street, Kibogaoka Hill or the Skyscraper district and Pharaoh Park and interrogate him, where he apologizes and says he was "just having a little fun", then reveals Yoyo was taken to the Fortified Residential Zone inside of the Sewage Facility. When they arrive, they discovered the place was rigged with bombs by the Golden Rhinos. They disable them all thinking they finally saved Yoyo when suddenly a group of Golden Rhino jets appear out of nowhere, they beat them and save Yoyo.

Yoyo then tells the GGs what happened: he had heard of the Golden Rhinos and went searching for more information, and he had gotten caught. After the rescue, the Golden Rhinos began tearing up the streets, which required the GGs to intervene. As soon as they clean the streets of all the Golden Rhinos, DJ Professor K and his radio station is carried away and a mysterious Golden Rhino train needs to be defeated, they then defeat it. The owner of the Rokkaku Group and mayor of Tokyo, Gouji Rokkaku, uses this time to broadcast an announcement to the city to gather at Shibuya Terminal. Here, he blares odd, creepy music from his strange tower. He absorbs all the people into the tower, telling them to "wipe the pitiful smiles off your face" and to "let the evil show, baby".

The GGs go to the bus terminal to stop him. They destroy Gouji's Beat creatures named Zero Beat and supposedly save the city, but they are soon absorbed inside the tower. Inside the tower, Gouji transforms into a giant monster but is defeated by the GGs again. The tower is destroyed, seemingly killing Gouji. As the game ends in the epilogue, DJ Professor K relates to the players how the hearts of men are easily corrupted by greed.

Music 
The music is played in a premixed format consisting of certain playlists directed to certain levels, although there is a jukebox. Alongside returning video game composers from the first game Hideki Naganuma and Richard Jacques, the soundtrack features artists such as indie rock band Guitar Vader, Beastie Boys Adrock side project BS 2000, hip hop/breakbeat group Scapegoat Wax, indie pop band Bis, The Latch Brothers (including Mike D of the Beastie Boys, Chris "Wag" Wagner and Kenny Tick Salcido), rock band Cibo Matto, musical collective Bran Van 3000, and hip hop group The Prunes.

Reception

Critical reception 
Jet Set Radio Future received "generally favorable" reviews according to Metacritic In Japan, Famitsu gave it a score of 32 out of 40.

The game was awarded "Outstanding Original Sports Game" and was nominated for "Outstanding Animation in a Game Engine", "Outstanding Art Direction in a Game Engine", and "Outstanding Original Musical Score" by the National Academy of Video Game Trade Reviewers. IGN called it "one of the coolest titles around" but said that it also fails to reach classic status because it was "not enough of a challenge". GameSpot described it as "one of the better Xbox games to date" and disagreed with IGN, claiming the game "offered a serious challenge". The publication named it the second-best video game of February 2002, and it won the annual "Best Platformer", "Best Music" and "Best Graphics (Artistic)" awards among Xbox games. It received a nomination for the Xbox "Game of the Year" prize, but lost to MechAssault. Despite positive reviews, this was not followed by high sales. It was nominated for GameSpots "Best Game No One Played on Xbox" award, and landed the title of the most unfairly ignored game in the OXM UK Awards the year of its release.

In 2009, Edge ranked the game at #44 on its list of "The 100 Best Games To Play Today", writing: "The sound track is peerless, and whether grinding vertically down a 200-foot dragon, leaping across Shibuya's handrails, or just cruising the wrong way down a one-way street, there's nowhere else that's so exhilarating to simply travel through". The game was also featured in 1001 Video Games You Must Play Before You Die.

Sales 
Jet Set Radio Future sold 80,000 units in the United States in its first six months. It sold a total of 28,433 units in Japan.

Legacy and fandom
Jet Set Radio Future was briefly featured in the music video to "Hella Good" by American rock band No Doubt.

Kuju Entertainment presented Sega with a concept for a new Jet Set Radio game for the Nintendo Wii, but Sega was not interested in developing new games in the series.

In 2017, Dinosaur Games created a visual proof-of-concept after Sony expressed interest in their work at GDC 2017. This project, Jet Set Radio Evolution, was turned down by Sega for largely unstated reasons.

In mid-2020 Jet Set Radio lead designer Kazuki Hosokawa told USGamer that he and his team were "too old and experienced" to create a new Jet Set Radio game with the "same energy" as the original. While Hosokawa still admired the work he and his team did on the first game on the series, Sega's continued reluctance to green light a new Jet Set Radio project have made a sequel near impossible.

The character Beat and stages based on Shibuya Terminal, Rokkaku Dai Heights, 99th Street, and Highway Zero appear in the 2010 game Sonic & Sega All-Stars Racing. The Shibuya stage also appears in the 2012 game Sonic & All-Stars Racing Transformed.

Jet Set Radio Future was later made backwards compatible for the Xbox 360. Unlike Jet Set Radio and other Sega games for Xbox, Jet Set Radio Future has not been made backwards compatible for the Xbox One or the Xbox Series X/S. In a 2023 interview, Xbox Game Studios CEO Phil Spencer confirmed that an unsuccessful attempt was made to add the game to Xbox's backwards compatibility program, stating: "One of the games I'd always wanted to get, we weren't able to land it in our backward compatibility program, was Jet Set Radio Future." Comicbook.com has speculated that this may be due to problems with licensing the soundtrack, among other reasons.

The game has been used on Xbox emulator CXBX as testing as well as Jet Set Radio Future Randomizer, an (RNG)-based mod of the game where everything is randomized. The game itself as well as the mod have both been speedrun at Games Done Quick.

Notes

References

External links
 

2002 video games
3D platform games
Graffiti video games
Multiplayer and single-player video games
Pack-in video games
Roller skating video games
Open-world video games
Sega video games
Smilebit games
Organized crime video games
Video game sequels
Video games featuring protagonists of selectable gender
Video games scored by Hideki Naganuma
Video games scored by Richard Jacques
Video games set in Japan
Video games set in Tokyo
Video games with cel-shaded animation
Xbox games
Xbox-only games
Video games developed in Japan